Horst Scheeser (24 June 1912 – 10 April 1998) was a Romanian alpine skier. He competed in the men's combined event at the 1936 Winter Olympics.

References

1912 births
1998 deaths
Romanian male alpine skiers
Olympic alpine skiers of Romania
Alpine skiers at the 1936 Winter Olympics
Sportspeople from Brașov